This list of preserved historic blast furnaces contains decommissioned blast furnaces, of which substantial remains survive. The furnaces are preserved in a park or museum, or as a site otherwise open to visitors, or intended to become such.

While pre-20th-century blast furnaces already have a long history of monument preservation, the perception of 20th century mass production blast furnace installations as industrial heritage is a comparably new trend. For a long time, it has been normal procedure for such a blast furnace to be demolished after being decommissioned and either be replaced with a newer, improved one, or to have the entire site demolished to make room for follow-up use of the area. It has only been in recent years that numerous countries have realized the value of blast furnaces as a part of their industrial history.

Historically, the first such blast furnace not to be demolished stands in Starachowice, Poland (decommissioned in 1968), followed by the last blast furnace of Yahata Steel Works in Yahatahigashi-ku, Kitakyūshū, Japan (decommissioned in 1972) and the "Carrie Furnaces" in Homestead, Pennsylvania in the United States (decommissioned in 1978). One of the two blast furnaces in Neunkirchen in Germany (decommissioned in 1982) was the first blast furnace worldwide to be not just preserved, but actively refurbished for the purpose of preservation.

For 20th-century mass production blast furnaces, the degree of accurate preservation versus integration into new structures, or even re-purposing, differs between the various sites. Colorful illumination installations at night are common.

List of preserved historic pre-mass production blast furnaces around the world

Australia

Austria

Brazil

Finland

Germany

Poland

Romania

Slovakia

Ukraine

United Kingdom

England

Scotland

Wales

United States

List of preserved industrial mass production blast furnaces around the world
These installations all date from the 20th century. They are supported by outer frames made of metal, were supplied with pre-heated blast air from external Cowper stoves, were typically part of large industrial compounds where, at one point, multiple blast furnaces were typically standing and operating side by side for efficiency reasons, raw materials were delivered by external elevating mechanisms, and the entire site was accessible by freight trains which delivered the raw materials and carried off the freshly smelted pig iron in ladles.

In many cases, the preserved sites have been deliberately stripped down to minimize maintenance costs; namely, some blast furnaces and related installations have been demolished. The goal was to only retain one or two blast furnaces including the relevant related installations (such as Cowper stoves, cast house, winch house etc.), which are considered sufficient to explain the blast furnace process and all related functions to visitors.

The first such decommissioned blast furnace that wasn't demolished and has been preserved to this very day stands in Starachowice, Poland, and has ceased operation as early as 1968.

Czech Republic

France

Germany

Japan

Luxembourg

Mexico

Poland

Romania

Russian Federation

Spain

United States

References

History of metallurgy
Steelmaking
Industry museums
History-related lists
Historical objects
Lists of historic places